Catasticta nimbice, the pine white or Mexican dartwhite, is a butterfly in the family Pieridae. It is found from Costa Rica north to Mexico. Rare strays can be found as far north as the Chisos Mountains of western Texas.

The upperside is creamy tan with thick black veins. There is a wide black outer margin surrounding the cream-colored spots. Males perch and patrol for females. Adults are on wing year round in Mexico. They have been recorded feeding on nectar from Fuscia, Lantana and Senecio species in Costa Rica.

The larvae feed on parasitic mistletoes, including Struthanthus species and Phoradendron velutinum. They feed in groups. Pupae are found in groups on tree trunks and look like bird droppings.

Subspecies
The following subspecies are recognized:
Catasticta nimbice nimbice (Mexico)
Catasticta nimbice ochracea (Bates, 1864) (Guatemala)
Catasticta nimbice bryson Godman & Salvin, [1889] (Costa Rica, Panama)
Catasticta nimbice ligata Eitschberger & Racheli, 1998 (Panama)

References

Pierini
Butterflies described in 1836
Taxa named by Jean Baptiste Boisduval